Emerson de Jesús Acuña Fluviano who usually is known as Emerson Acuña (born June 16, 1979) is a retired Colombian football striker.

External links
 Official Website
 

1979 births
Living people
Footballers from Barranquilla
Colombian footballers
Categoría Primera A players
Atlético Junior footballers
Once Caldas footballers
Uniautónoma F.C. footballers
Deportivo Anzoátegui players
José Gálvez FBC footballers
Colombian expatriate footballers
Colombian expatriate sportspeople in Venezuela
Colombian expatriate sportspeople in Peru
Expatriate footballers in Venezuela
Expatriate footballers in Peru
Association football forwards